Gerber Legendary Blades is an American maker of knives, multitools, and other tools for outdoors and military headquartered in Portland, Oregon. Gerber is owned by the Finnish outdoors products company Fiskars. Gerber was established in 1939 by Pete Gerber.

Gerber is the "largest maker of knives and multi-tools for the United States armed forces." The LMF II Infantry Knife, features a partial tang blade instead of a full tang blade, ostensibly to avoid electric shocks because the knife was designed to free pilots from downed aircraft.

Gerber was the first knife company to collaborate with a custom knife maker when it collaborated with World War II knife maker David Murphy.

In 2010 Bear Grylls designed a line of Gerber survival knives, including the best selling Ultimate knife. The Bear Grylls range from Geber progressed to including items such as a water bottle, survival kit and tinder grinder. By 2019 the cooperation between Bear Grylls and Gerber ended.

History
In 1910, the Gerber family started an advertising firm in Portland, Oregon. While working for the family business, Joseph Gerber mailed twenty four sets of kitchen knives to clients during the holidays. These handmade knives were very popular, with then catalog retailer Abercrombie & Fitch requesting more of these knives from Gerber to sell in their catalog in 1939. Gerber started Gerber Legendary Blades that same year.

In 1966, the company relocated to new headquarters in Tigard, Oregon. Finnish company Fiskars purchased the private company in 1987.

Chad Vincent was hired as chief executive officer in July 2001. By October 2003, the company employed three hundred people, and had revenues near $100 million and was the second leading seller of multitools in the United States, after Leatherman, another company based in the Portland area.

Designs
Designers who have since designed knives for Gerber include: Bob Loveless, Paul Poehlmann, Blackie Collins, William Harsey Jr., Fred Carter, Rick Hinderer, Brad Parrish, Ernest Emerson and Matt Larsen. Former Gerber employees who have started their own successful knife companies include Al Mar and Pete Kershaw.
Gerber built a line of folding knives based on designs of Rex Applegate.

Models
Models of Gerber fixed blade knives include:
the Gerber Guardian: A boot knife designed by knife maker Bob Loveless more than twenty years ago. 
the Gerber Mark II: A fighting knife. 
the Gerber BMF    : A survival knife. 
the Gerber LMF II Infantry
the Gerber 31-001901 Bear Grylls Ultimate Pro 
the Gerber 22-41121 Prodigy Survival Knife
the Gerber Blackie Collins Clip-lock Diving Knife
the Gerber Strongarm
the LMF II ASEK, or Aircrew Survival and Egress Knife

Models of Gerber folding knives include:

 The Bear Grylls Folding Sheath Knife
 The Flatiron, their only folding cleaver blade knife.
 The Paraframe, a lightweight pocketknife.
 The Kettlebell, a compact pocketknife.
 The Gerber/Emerson Alliance: The first automatic knife made by either company is based on the profile of Emerson Knives, Inc.'s earlier Raven knife design and is an issued item to certain military units under the NSN (NATO Stock Numbers): 5110-01-516-3243 and 5110-01-516-3244.
 the Gerber Gator: A single blade lockback knife with an ergonomic thermoplastic handle molded to resemble alligator skin.

Models of Gerber multi tools include:

 The Center-Drive, known for its automatic opening pliers and bit driver
 The Suspension Multi-Plier, a butterfly opening multi tool
 The Truss, a butterfly opening multi tool and successor to the Suspension
 The Suspension-NXT, a butterfly opening multi tool and successor to the Suspension

Gerber recently announced several new knives and one multi tool at the 2019 SHOT Show.

Gallery

See also
 Buck Knives
 Knife making
 List of companies based in Oregon

References 

Birds and Bees:  How Businesses Are Really Born (Section on Gerber)

External links
 

Knife manufacturing companies
Multi-tool manufacturers
Mechanical hand tools
Fiskars
Manufacturing companies based in Oregon
Companies based in Tigard, Oregon
Manufacturing companies established in 1939
1939 establishments in Oregon
Tool manufacturing companies of the United States